Babacar Niasse (born 20 December 1996) is a professional footballer who plays as a goalkeeper for Liga Portugal 2 club Tondela. Born in Senegal, he plays for the Mauritania national team.

Club career
Niasse was an attacking midfielder, but changed to a goalkeeper and is known for his exceptional height. An Aspire Academy youth graduate, he joined Eupen in 2015.

On 21 August 2019, Niasse signed a 3-year contract with Portuguese Primeira Liga club Tondela.

International career
Born in Senegal, Niasse is of Mauritanian descent. He was the goalkeeper for the Senegal U17 selection for the 2011 African U-17 Championship. He was called up to represent the senior Mauritania national team for a set of friendlies in March 2022.

References

External links
Niasse Eurosport Profile
Niasse Maxifoot Profile

1996 births
Living people
Footballers from Dakar
Mauritanian footballers
Mauritania international footballers
Senegalese footballers
Senegal youth international footballers
Senegalese people of Mauritanian descent
Association football goalkeepers
Belgian Pro League players
Challenger Pro League players
Primeira Liga players
K.A.S. Eupen players
C.D. Tondela players
Senegalese expatriate footballers
Expatriate footballers in Belgium
Senegalese expatriate sportspeople in Belgium
Expatriate footballers in Portugal
Aspire Academy (Senegal) players
Mauritanian expatriate footballers
Mauritanian expatriates in Portugal